Visual DialogScript (VDS) is an interpreted programming language for Microsoft Windows. It can be used to create small and fast programs. VDS has a large number of dialog and graphical elements available to create professional looking programs. VDS programs have access to the Windows API; therefore, it is possible to write applications that can perform the same advanced tasks as other programming languages such as Visual Basic, C++, or Delphi.

Language
Unlike other programming languages, the syntax of VDS is very simple. Each command occupies one line, and has a plain English name that clearly describes its purpose. Variables are typeless, and can hold many kinds of information, for example, numbers or text. Functions are clearly distinguishable with names that start with '@', just like a spreadsheet.

The DialogScript language has a simple syntax not unlike MS-DOS batch language. It is designed for ease of use and efficiency when being interpreted by the run-time engine. There are 10 system variables, %0 to %9, which initially have the script file name in %0 and command line parameters in %1 through %9, just as in a batch file. There are also a further 26 user variables, %A to %Z. The contents of all variables (including system ones) can be changed once the script is running. There are now also 4032 global variables. These variables begin with %%, a letter, then alphanumerics plus underscores (e.g. %%my_variable_1.) There is no limit on the length of these user-defined variable names.

Syntax examples
Comments:
 # This is a single line comment
 REM This is a single line comment

Simple Information Message Box:
info "This is the information text"

Simple Warning Message Box:
warn "This is the warning text"

Create a custom dialog box:
dialog create,<name>,<top pixel position>,<left pixel position>,<width in pixels>,<height in pixels>

Write to the Windows Registry:
registry write,<root key>,<key>,<subkey>,<data>

Display an input prompt dialog box, storing the result in the variable %A:
%A = @input("Please enter a value:")

History
Visual DialogScript was created by Julian Moss (1953 – October 24, 2014) of JM-Tech/Tech-Pro Ltd. In 1998, after version 3.0, Emmanuel Daunizeau of S.A.D.E. sarl, took over the ownership and development of VDS, modifying and improving its syntax. Currently, VDS is marketed by the British company Commercial Research Ltd. and is still the property of Emmanuel Daunizeau who continues to develop it.

Several versions of VDS have been released over time:
 Visual DialogScript 2.0
 Visual DialogScript 2.5
 Visual DialogScript 3.0
 Visual DialogScript 3.5
 Visual DialogScript 4
 Visual DialogScript 4.5
 Visual DialogScript 5
 Visual DialogScript 5.01
 Visual DialogScript 5.02
 Visual DialogScript 6

Currently available versions
There are several versions available for download:
 Personal Visual DialogScript (PVDS) 4: This freeware version is intended for students and home PC users. The package includes a short tutorial and full online help which includes many example scripts. The software is not licensable for commercial use. This version is incapable of producing compiled executable files; however, compiling files is not necessary, as a script file can be executed directly by opening it from Windows Explorer on any system that has PVDS installed on it.
 Visual DialogScript 2.5 (16-Bit Edition): This version marked the last release for Windows 3.1+ (16-bit).
 Visual DialogScript 5: This version is for power users, business users, and professional developers who use—or are developing scripts for—Windows 95/98/ME or Windows NT/2000/XP. This version can create compiled executable files, and includes a royalty-free run-time license (once registered). Additional features include an icon editor and support for many add-on extensions. As a 32-bit program, it supports long filenames, task bar tray icons, unlimited length strings and string lists and the Windows Registry. This legacy version is now available for download for registered users and is not available for purchase.
 Visual DialogScript 6: The newest version of Visual DialogScript improves upon Visual DialogScript 5 and adds full support for Windows Vista. Additionally, the registered version can now create standalone compiled executable files that do not require an external runtime file.

References

External links
Official Visual DialogScript Site
VDSWORLD: The Unofficial VDS Community
VDSWORLD Discussion Forums
 uVeDeSe: Unofficial Visual DialogScript Spanish Site
DragonSphere Software - Home of GadgetX Site
ShinobiSoft Software - Home of SSMenu, SSTreeVw, and SSZip dlls

Scripting languages